is a  Japanese female idol group consisting of four teams. The name refers to the members of the group wearing masks which cover their faces during the performances of most songs and much of the promotional material, with the type of mask varying between the various subgroups. The music of Kamen Joshi is usually rock or heavy metal, often with rap verses. The members rarely play instruments themselves and most performances are presented with playback rather than with a live band. Kamen Joshi performs daily at the P.A.R.M.S theater in Akihabara, Tokyo or the Kamen Joshi Theater in Osaka.

Kamen Joshi became the first independent female artist to achieve a number-one single on the Oricon Weekly Singles chart in January 2015, achieving sales figures of over 130,000 copies of their single .

Members and subgroups
The larger group of Kamen Joshi is an umbrella for the smaller groups Alice No. 10 (ja), Steam Girls (ja), Armor Girls (ja) and Easter Girls (ja). Three groups (Alice No. 10, Steam Girls and Armor Girls) regularly perform at their exclusive "Kamen Joshi Café" in Pasela, Akihabara. Easter Girls regularly perform at "KamenJoshi Theater" (sic) in Osaka. There are also songs by Kamen Joshi as a whole, with about 25 members from all groups performing together. These are mostly in the musical style of Alice No. 10 and are performed with all participants wearing Alice No. 10's masks.

At Kamen Joshi concerts, the setlists include both performances by Kamen Joshi as a whole as well as performances by the subgroups, freely mixed. One man live is the usual term used in Japan for concerts of a single band, even if it consists of multiple members, as opposed to festivals with multiple artists.

The center position of Alice No. 10 and informal leader of the Kamen Joshi as a whole wears a red hockey mask, while all other members wear regular off-white ones.

The first of the Kamen Joshi groups to be formed is called , while the spelling Alice No. 10 with the same pronunciation is also used. The latter is also the spelling used on western services like iTunes. Foreign fans often refer to the group with a simplified romaji spelling of Alice Juban. The name refers to the Alice Project, the idol project within which Kamen Joshi originates. 
Alice No. 10's music often includes metal breakdowns and rap sections. All members wear Jason Voorhees-style hockey masks and wield a selection of prop weapons ranging from chainsaws to giant scissors.

 ("Red Mask" position)
 (ja) (announced graduation)
 (ja)
 (announced graduation)
 (ja)
 (announced graduation)

Former Alice No. 10 member  (ja) was also active as an atomweight Mixed Martial Arts fighter during her time in the group, displayed the Kamen Joshi logo on her shorts during fights. She retired from the sport on June 9, 2021, nearly 2 months after her graduation from Kamen Joshi.

Steam Girls was formed as Alice Jūban's official sister and rival group. Though their first song, "destiny", was a pop-rock number, since the release of "HIGH and LOW" in 2013, their music has come to incorporate more sounds from electronic and dance music. The members wear gas masks and leg warmers in a style combining elements from steampunk and cybergoth fashion. On stage, they carry distinctive prop guns (called "Laser Gun" and "Steam Gun") that fire laser beams and clouds of dry ice together. Unusual for the pop music industry, member Tomoka Igari is a wheelchair user. She participates in the choreographies normally, as far as her condition permits, performing the upper-body movements and position changes. Igari talking about her condition and presenting visual upgrades to her wheelchair are a regular part of Kamen Joshi solo concerts. 
 (ja)

Armor Girls was formed after Alice No. 10 and Steam Girls had already released two singles as Kamen Joshi. Their masks resemble fantasy-themed plate armour helmets with visors, and they carry prop rifles called "Armor Gun".

 (ja)

 (ja) (announced graduation)

Easter Girls is fourth group of Kamen Joshi, formed in Osaka. The group imagines an Easter festival. Easter Girls' songs incorporate sounds from Ska Rock.

 (ja)

The group called Slime Girls is not an individual musical unit but rather a group of new entrees into Kamen Joshi not yet deemed capable enough to participate in the regular performances. They sometimes open for the regular group. The name likely refers to Slimes, the first monsters a player encounters in games like Dragon Quest and some versions of Final Fantasy and The Legend of Zelda. Slimes have therefore become a cultural icon in Japan representing low level or beginner tasks.

Discography

Singles

Albums

DVDs

Donald Trump video
During the 2016 United States presidential election campaigning period, Kamen Joshi released a video voicing their support of Donald Trump, with a disclaimer stating that the video is only "entertainment", and "does not represent the political thoughts and beliefs of the members and their affiliated offices."

References

Notes

External links

 
 
 

Japanese girl groups
Japanese idol groups
Masked musicians
Musical groups established in 2013
2013 establishments in Japan